Alison Mears is a certified AIA LEED AP Architect and is the current head of the Healthy Materials Lab at Parsons The New School for Design. Mears was previously the director of the BFA Architecture and Interior Design Programs in the School of Constructed Environments and an Assistant Professor of Architecture at Parsons.

Education
Mears received her undergraduate degree in Science from the Australian National University, her Bachelor of Architecture degree from the University of Canberra and a Masters in Architecture from Columbia University.

Career
Her prior professional experience has been with Pei Cobb Freed & Partners Architects, and Mitchell/Giurgola and Thorp Architects. Mears currently manages her own office, Paci+Mears Architects in Brooklyn, New York where she works on small-scale residential and commercial projects. While running her own practice, she has also directed the BFA Architecture and Interior Design programs at Parsons the New School for Design and is the current Dean of the School of Design Strategies at Parsons The New School for Design, where she teaches many community-based studio courses in New Orleans, Washington, D.C., Warren, Ohio, and Skid Row, Los Angeles.

Notable projects

With Pei Cobb Freed & Partners Architects
 Ronald Reagan Building and International Trade Center, Washington D.C.
 Friedrichstraße Passagen Office and Retail complex, Berlin
 Canary Wharf-Canada Square Office Tower, London
 Beatrixkwartier Office and Retail Complex, The Hague 
 John F. Kennedy Airport Central Terminal Complex in New York City

With Mitchell/Giurgola and Thorp Architects
 Parliament House, Canberra

Publications
 Mears, Alison. Seeking Shelter- An Investigation into Solutions for the Homeless. Jun 14 2012. .
 Mears, Alison, ed. INTEGRAL CITY: A collaborative design approach to downtown Greensboro, NC. Jun 2013.

References

Living people
University of Canberra alumni
Australian National University alumni
Columbia Graduate School of Architecture, Planning and Preservation alumni
The New School faculty
Parsons School of Design faculty
Australian women architects
Architecture educators
Australian architecture writers
American women architects
20th-century Australian architects
20th-century American architects
21st-century Australian architects
21st-century American architects
Year of birth missing (living people)
20th-century Australian women
21st-century Australian women
20th-century American women
American women academics
21st-century American women